Insecure may refer to:

 Lack of security, in an objective sense:
 Risk
 Data security
 Computer security
 Food insecurity
 Emotional insecurity, in psychology

Media 
 Insecure (TV series), a television series on HBO
 InSecurity, a Canadian television sitcom
 "Insecurity" (South Park), a 2012 episode of the animated sitcom South Park
 Insecure (film), a 2014 French drama film

See also
 
 
 
 
 InSec, internal security